"All for the Love of Sunshine" is a song written by music executive Mike Curb, Harley Hatcher and Lalo Schifrin, recorded by American country music singer Hank Williams Jr. 
The song went to number one on the Billboard Hot Country Singles chart in September 1970. Williams was backed by The Mike Curb Congregation on the song. It is featured prominently in the Clint Eastwood film Kelly's Heroes.

Chart performance

References

External links
[ Allmusic — All For the Love of Sunshine by Hank Williams Jr.].

1970 songs
1970 singles
Hank Williams Jr. songs
Steve Holy songs
MGM Records singles